Udharbond Assembly constituency (Bengali: উধারবন্দ বিধানসভা সমষ্টি) is one of the 126 state legislative assembly constituencies in Assam state in North Eastern India. It is also one of the 7 state legislative assembly constituencies included in the Silchar Lok Sabha constituency.

Members of Legislative Assembly

Election results

2021 results

2016 results

See also
 Udharbond
 Cachar District

References

External links 
 

Cachar district
Assembly constituencies of Assam